The Catastrophic Theatre was founded in 2007 by Houston theatre veterans Jason Nodler and Tamarie Cooper. The theatre is considered a leader in the city's experimental and original performance scene.

The Catastrophic Theatre has received two MAP Grants. The first, in 2009 supported a musical production, Bluefinger. The Theatre received a 2011 MAP Grant to support production an original play by Mickle Maher. In 2013, the theatre was awarded the American Theatre Wing's National Theatre Company Grant.

References

External links 

 Official website

Theatre companies in Houston